In molecular biology, glycoside hydrolase family 5 is a family of glycoside hydrolases.

Glycoside hydrolases  are a widespread group of enzymes that hydrolyse the glycosidic bond between two or more carbohydrates, or between a carbohydrate and a non-carbohydrate moiety. A classification system for glycoside hydrolases, based on sequence similarity, has led to the definition of >100 different families. This classification is available on the CAZy web site, and also discussed at CAZypedia, an online encyclopedia of carbohydrate active enzymes.

Glycoside hydrolase family 5 CAZY GH_5 comprises enzymes with several known activities including endoglucanase; beta-mannanase; exo-1,3-glucanase; endo-1,6-glucanase; xylanase; endoglycoceramidase; xanthanase.

The microbial degradation of cellulose and xylans requires several types of enzymes. Fungi and bacteria produces a spectrum of cellulolytic enzymes (cellulases) and xylanases which, on the basis of sequence similarities, can be classified into families. One of these families is known as the cellulase family A or as the glycosyl hydrolases family 5. One of the conserved regions in this family contains a conserved glutamic acid residue which is potentially involved in the catalytic mechanism.

In a recent study using Molecular Dynamics simulations, a considerable correlation between thermal stability and structural rigidity of members of family 5 with solved structures has been proved.

External links 
 GH5 in CAZypedia

References 

EC 3.2.1
GH family
Protein families